Poland Central School is a K-12 (primary and secondary) school in Poland, New York, United States, located in Herkimer County.   It is part of the Poland Central School District.

Overview 
Total enrollment (Pre-K through 12) for the 2007-08 school year was 697 students.

The current school building was originally constructed in 1936, with expansions in 1957, 1962, and 1976.

In May 2008, voters approved a budget of $12,460,905.

Sports
The boys baseball team won the 1990 State Championship.

In 2012 and 2020, the Girls Varsity Soccer team won the Class D New York State Championship.

References

External links
school web site

Public high schools in New York (state)
Public middle schools in New York (state)
Public elementary schools in New York (state)
Schools in Herkimer County, New York